Axel Fredrik Londen (5 August 1859 – 8 September 1928) was a Finnish sports shooter, who competed in the 1912 Summer Olympics.

Olympics 

He was a member of the board of the Finnish Olympic Committee in 1907–1908 and 1911–1913.

Biography 

His parents were vicar and rural dean Karl Fredrik Londen and Emilia Nordenstreng. His was married to Valborg Ferlmann in 1895–1919 and to Maria Elisabet Magnuson since 1920.

He obtained a legal degree in 1886 and the title of varatuomari in 1889.

He moved to Sweden to manage a tobacco factory in the 1910s and got their citizenship. He moved back to Finland after bankruptcy.

He was the chairman of the shooting club Suomen Metsästysyhdistys in 1911–1917.

He edited the outdoors magazine Metsästys ja Kalastus.

He was the first executive manager of the Finnish Hunters' Association in 1922–1927. According to himself, he shot at least two bears and 17 mooses.

He also was briefly the mayor of Ekenäs and held various jobs in the Finnish government.

He was the secretary of the Finnish Maritime Administration from 1924 up to his death.

Sources

References

1859 births
1928 deaths
Finnish male sport shooters
Running target shooters
Shooters at the 1912 Summer Olympics
Olympic shooters of Finland
Olympic bronze medalists for Finland
Olympic medalists in shooting
Medalists at the 1912 Summer Olympics